Stary Oskol Airport (also given as Staryy Oskol)  is an airport in Russia located 6 km northwest of Stary Oskol.  It is a small civilian airport with a  runway.

Infrastructure
The airport's runway is designated 04/22 and measures . The airport can handle 30 passengers per hour, and it has parking spaces for four medium-range aircraft.

References

External links
Stary Oskol Airport official website 

Airports built in the Soviet Union
Airports in Belgorod Oblast